'Amritganj' (Nepali: अमृतगञ्ज) is a Municipality  in Bara District in the Narayani Zone of south-eastern Nepal. At the time of the 2011 Nepal census it had a population of 9,133 persons living in 1466 individual households. There were 4,609 males and 4,524 females at the time of census.

References

https://goo.gl/maps/g4eKe7JU3Y62

External links
UN map of the municipalities of Bara District

Populated places in Bara District